The 2022–23 Quinnipiac Bobcats men's basketball team represent Quinnipiac University in the 2022–23 NCAA Division I men's basketball season. The Bobcats, led by sixth-year head coach Baker Dunleavy, play their home games at M&T Bank Arena in Hamden, Connecticut as members of the Metro Atlantic Athletic Conference.

Previous season
The Bobcats finished the 2021–22 season 14–17, 7–13 in MAAC play to finish tied for last place. As the 11 seed, they defeated 6 seed Marist in the first round of the MAAC Tournament, upset 3 seed Siena in the quarterfinals, before falling to eventual champions Saint Peter's in the semifinals.

Roster

Schedule and results

|-
!colspan=12 style=| Regular season

|-
!colspan=12 style=| MAAC tournament

Source

References

Quinnipiac Bobcats men's basketball seasons
Quinnipiac Bobcats
Quinnipiac Bobcats men's basketball
Quinnipiac Bobcats men's basketball